Aneby Municipality (Aneby kommun) is a municipality in Jönköping County in southern Sweden, where the town Aneby is the seat.

The municipality was formed in 1967 when the municipalities of Bredestad and Hullaryd, both created in 1952 were amalgamated. The name was taken from the largest locality, Aneby, which was chosen as the seat. Before 1952 there were nine municipalities in the area.

Localities
There are 3 urban areas (or localities) in Aneby Municipality.

In the table the localities are listed according to the size of the population as of December 31, 2005. The municipal seat is in bold characters.

Demography
Aneby Municipality is the smallest municipality in the county. In 1994, the population in the municipality was at an all-time high of 7,300 persons, which is attributed to refugees from former Yugoslavia. The population has since decreased, to the regret of the officials who are promoting to get it populated to the 8,000 inhabitants its service is designated for.

Politics
Result of the 2010 election:
 Moderate Party 22,59%	
 Centre Party 12,31%
 Liberal People's Party 5,05%	
 Christian Democrats 17,66%	
 Swedish Social Democratic Party 26,62%	
 Left Party 2,99%
 Green Party 4,60%
 Sweden Democrats 7,62%
 Other Parties 0,57%

References
Statistics Sweden

External links

Aneby Municipality - Official site

Municipalities of Jönköping County